Major General Anatoly Vasilyevich Filipchenko (26 February 1928 – 7 August 2022) was a Soviet cosmonaut of Ukrainian descent. He flew on the Soyuz 7 and Soyuz 16 missions.

He was born in Davydovka, Voronezh Governorate, RSFSR. After leaving the space programme in 1982, Filipchenko became the Deputy Director of the OKB in Kharkiv. He died on 7 August 2022, at the age of 94. He was buried in the Federal Military Memorial Cemetery on 11 August 2022.

Awards 
 Hero of the Soviet Union
 Pilot-Cosmonaut of the USSR
 Order of Lenin
 Order of the Red Banner of Labour
 Medal "For Merit in Space Exploration"
 State Prize of the USSR
 Order of the Flag of the People's Republic of Hungary
 Order of the Banner of the Bulgarian People's Republic
 Medal "For the Strengthening Military Cooperation" (Czechoslovakia)
 Medal "Brotherhood in Arms" (GDR)

Notes

References

External links 
 

1928 births
2022 deaths
1969 in spaceflight
Heroes of the Soviet Union
People from Liskinsky District
Soviet Air Force generals
Soviet major generals
Soviet cosmonauts
Russian people of Ukrainian descent
Recipients of the Medal "For Merit in Space Exploration"
Recipients of the USSR State Prize
Recipients of the Order of Lenin
Recipients of the Order of the Red Banner of Labour
Burials at the Federal Military Memorial Cemetery